Božidar Vučićević (born 9 December 1998) is a Serbian volleyball player who was a member of Slovenian club ACH Volley. Three–time Serbian Champion (2017, 2018, 2019).

He currently plays for Arkaz Turkish National Volleyball Ligue

Sporting achievements

Clubs
 CEV Challenge Cup
  2021/2022 – with Halkbank Ankara 

 National championships
 2016/2017  Serbian Championship, with OK Vojvodina
 2017/2018  Serbian Championship, with OK Vojvodina
 2018/2019  Serbian Championship, with OK Vojvodina
 2019/2020  Slovenian Cup, with ACH Volley

References

External links
 Player profile at CEV.eu
 Player profile at WorldofVolley.com
 Player profile at Volleybox.net

1998 births
Living people
Sportspeople from Novi Sad
Serbian men's volleyball players
Serbian expatriate sportspeople in Slovenia
Expatriate volleyball players in Slovenia